Young–Yentes–Mattern Farm, also known as Maple Grove Farmstead, is a historic home and farm located in Dallas Township, Huntington County, Indiana. The farm includes three residences: the original log house (1838), the former Dallas Township School Number 2 and used as a residence, and the Queen Anne main house built between 1896 and 1910.  The two-story, frame main house has a front facing gable roof with fishscale shingles and a wraparound porch.  Also on the property are a number of contributing outbuildings including the milk house, chicken house, garage, smokehouse, hog house, small barn, and large bank barn.

It was listed on the National Register of Historic Places in 2001.

References

Farms on the National Register of Historic Places in Indiana
Queen Anne architecture in Indiana
Houses completed in 1838
Buildings and structures in Huntington County, Indiana
National Register of Historic Places in Huntington County, Indiana